Julie Hogg (née Whitehouse) (born 4 November 1958 in New Zealand) is a former association football player who represented New Zealand at international level.

Hogg made her Football Ferns debut in a 2–2 draw with Australia on 6 October 1979, and finished her international career with 19 caps and 7 goals to her credit.

Hogg continues to be involved in women's international football as team manager at the 2007 FIFA Women's World Cup and the 2008 Olympic Games

References

1958 births
Living people
New Zealand women's association footballers
New Zealand women's international footballers
Women's association footballers not categorized by position